HMAS Elwing (W129, FY42) was a tug boat operated by the Royal Australian Navy (RAN) during World War II.

Operational history
Built in Rockhampton, Queensland for the Rockhampton Harbour Board, she was requisitioned by the RAN on 16 June 1942.

Citations

References

Ships built in Queensland
Tugboats of the Royal Australian Navy